Domingo Nicolas Damigella (born January 6, 1968 in Tandil, Buenos Aires) is a former featherweight boxer from Argentina, who represented his native country at the 1988 Summer Olympics in Seoul, South Korea. There he was eliminated in the first round by Great Britain's David Anderson. Nicknamed Minguito, Damigella made his professional debut on November 26, 1988.

1988 Olympic results
Below is the record of Domingo Damigella, an Argentinian featherweight boxer who competed at the 1988 Seoul Olympics:

 Round of 64: lost to David Anderson (Great Britain) by decision, 1-4

Title bouts

References
 

1968 births
Living people
People from Tandil
Featherweight boxers
Boxers at the 1988 Summer Olympics
Olympic boxers of Argentina
Argentine male boxers
Sportspeople from Buenos Aires Province
Pan American Games medalists in boxing
Pan American Games bronze medalists for Argentina
Medalists at the 1987 Pan American Games
Boxers at the 1987 Pan American Games